Arouna Sangante (born 12 April 2002) is a Senegalese professional football player who plays for Le Havre.

Club career 
Arouna Sangante played for Cosmos Saint-Denis and Red Star in Île-de-France, before joining Le Havre AC in 2017.

He made his Ligue 2 debut for Le Havre on the 15 May 2021, starting the game against the league champions of  ESTAC Troyes.

References

External links

2002 births
Living people
Senegalese footballers
Association football defenders
People from Dakar Region
Le Havre AC players
Ligue 2 players
Championnat National 2 players
Championnat National 3 players
Senegalese expatriate footballers
Senegalese expatriate sportspeople in France
Expatriate footballers in France